Knut Olav Rindarøy (born 17 July 1985) is a retired Norwegian footballer who played for Molde, Deportivo La Coruña and the Norwegian National Team.

Club career
Rindarøy began his career with Molde FK in 2003 and appeared in over 200 league matches with the Norwegian club. His play with the club led to interest from various top European sides. On 18 January 2010, Skysports.com reported that Rindarøy was travelling to England for trials with Everton, Nottingham Forest, and Manchester United – which was confirmed by Molde director Tarje Nordstrand Jacobsen. On 20 August 2010 it was reported that he has signed with Spain's Deportivo La Coruña. Rindarøy made his debut for Deportivo La Coruña against Almeria on 26 September 2010.

On 29 November 2017, Rindarøy announced his retirement from football due to injuries.

Career statistics

Club

International

Statistics accurate as of match played 12 October 2010

Honours
Molde
 Tippeligaen (3): 2011, 2012, 2014
 Norwegian Football Cup (2): 2005, 2013

References

External links 
  Player profile on official club website
  National Caps
 
 New Deal with Deportivo La Coruña

1985 births
Living people
People from Molde
Norwegian footballers
Norway under-21 international footballers
Norway youth international footballers
Norway international footballers
Molde FK players
Deportivo de La Coruña players
Eliteserien players
Norwegian First Division players
La Liga players
Norwegian expatriate footballers
Expatriate footballers in Spain
Norwegian expatriate sportspeople in Spain
Association football defenders
Sportspeople from Møre og Romsdal